

Events

Pre-1600
1138 – A massive earthquake strikes Aleppo; it is one of the most destructive earthquakes ever.
1142 – A peace treaty ends the Jin–Song wars.
1311 – The peerage and clergy restrict the authority of English kings with the Ordinances of 1311.

1601–1900
1614 – The New Netherland Company applies to the States General of the Netherlands for exclusive trading rights in what is now the northeastern United States.
1634 – The Burchardi flood kills around 15,000 in North Friesland, Denmark and Germany.
1649 – Cromwell's New Model Army sacks Wexford, killing over 2,000 Irish Confederate troops and 1,500 civilians.
1767 – Surveying for the Mason–Dixon line separating Maryland from Pennsylvania is completed.
1776 – American Revolution: A fleet of American boats on Lake Champlain is defeated by the Royal Navy, but delays the British advance until 1777.
1797 – The Royal Navy decisively defeats the Batavian Navy at Camperdown during the French Revolutionary Wars.
1811 – The Juliana begins operation as the first steam-powered ferry in New York harbor.
1840 – The Maronite leader Bashir Shihab II surrenders to the Ottoman Empire and later is sent to Malta in exile.
1852 – The University of Sydney, Australia's oldest university, is inaugurated in Sydney.
1862 – American Civil War: Confederate troops conduct a raid on Chambersburg, Pennsylvania.
1865 – Hundreds of black men and women march in Jamaica, starting the Morant Bay rebellion.
1890 – In Washington, D.C., the Daughters of the American Revolution is founded.
1899 – The Second Boer War erupts in South Africa between the British-ruled Cape Colony, and the Boer-ruled Transvaal and Orange Free State.

1901–present
1906 – San Francisco sparks a diplomatic crisis between the United States and Japan by ordering segregated schools for Japanese students.
1910 – Piloted by Arch Hoxsey, Theodore Roosevelt becomes the first U.S. president to fly in an airplane.
1912 – First Balkan War: The day after the Battle of Sarantaporo, Greek troops liberate the city of Kozani.
1918 – The 7.1  San Fermín earthquake shakes Puerto Rico. The quake and resulting tsunami kill up to 116 people.
1937 – The Duke and Duchess of Windsor tour Nazi Germany for 12 days and meet Adolf Hitler on the 22nd.
1941 – Beginning of the National Liberation War of Macedonia.
1942 – World War II: Off Guadalcanal, United States Navy ships intercept and defeat a Japanese force.
1944 – The Tuvan People's Republic is annexed by the Soviet Union.
1950 – CBS's field-sequential color system for television is the first to be licensed for broadcast by the U.S. Federal Communications Commission.
1954 – In accord with the 1954 Geneva Conference, French troops complete their withdrawal from North Vietnam.
1958 – NASA launches Pioneer 1, its first space probe, although it fails to achieve a stable orbit.
1961 – The 1st Summit of the Non-Aligned Movement is held in Belgrade, SFR Yugoslavia, resulting in the establishment of the Non-Aligned Movement.
1962 – The Second Vatican Council becomes the first ecumenical council of the Roman Catholic Church in 92 years.
1968 – NASA launches Apollo 7, the first successful manned Apollo mission.
1976 – George Washington is posthumously promoted to the grade of General of the Armies.
1984 – Aboard the Space Shuttle Challenger, astronaut Kathryn D. Sullivan becomes the first American woman to perform a space walk.
  1984   – Aeroflot Flight 3352 crashes into maintenance vehicles upon landing in Omsk, Russia, killing 178.
1986 – Ronald Reagan and Mikhail Gorbachev meet in Iceland to continue discussions about scaling back IRBM arsenals in Europe.
1987 – The AIDS Memorial Quilt is first displayed during the Second National March on Washington for Lesbian and Gay Rights.
  1987   – Start of Operation Pawan by Indian forces in Sri Lanka. Thousands of civilians, insurgents, soldiers die.
1991 – Prof. Anita Hill delivers her televised testimony concerning sexual harassment during the Clarence Thomas Supreme Court nomination.
1999 – Air Botswana pilot Chris Phatswe steals an ATR 42 from Sir Seretse Khama International Airport and later crashes it into two other aircraft at the airport, killing himself. 
2000 – NASA launches STS-92, the 100th Space Shuttle mission.
2001 – The Polaroid Corporation files for federal bankruptcy protection.
2002 – A bomb attack in a Myyrmanni shopping mall in Vantaa, Finland kills seven.
2013 – A migrant boat sinks in the Channel of Sicily, with at least 34 people drowning.
2018 – Soyuz MS-10, launching an intended crew for the ISS, suffers an in-flight abort. The crew lands safely.

Births

Pre-1600
1492 – Charles Orlando, Dauphin of France, French noble (d. 1495)
1552 – Tsarevich Dmitry Ivanovich of Russia, Grand Prince of Moscow (d. 1553)

1601–1900
1616 – Andreas Gryphius, German poet and playwright (d. 1664)
1661 – Melchior de Polignac, French cardinal and poet (d. 1742)
1671 – Frederick IV of Denmark (d. 1730)
1672 – Pylyp Orlyk, Ukrainian-Romanian diplomat (d. 1742)
1675 – Samuel Clarke, English minister and philosopher (d. 1729)
1738 – Arthur Phillip, English admiral and politician, 1st Governor of New South Wales (d. 1814)
1739 – Grigory Potemkin, Russian general and politician (d. 1791)
1758 – Heinrich Wilhelm Matthias Olbers, German physician and astronomer (d. 1840)
1778 – George Bridgetower, British musician and composer (d. 1860)
1782 – Steen Steensen Blicher, Danish author and poet (d. 1848)
1786 – Stevenson Archer, American judge and politician (d. 1848)
1788 – Simon Sechter, Austrian organist, composer, and conductor (d. 1867)
1793 – Maria James, Welsh-born American poet, domestic servant (d. 1868)
1803 – Gregor von Helmersen, Estonian-Russian general and geologist (d. 1885)
1814 – Jean-Baptiste Lamy, French-American archbishop (d. 1888)
1815 – Pierre Napoléon Bonaparte, Italian-French politician (d. 1881)
1821 – George Williams, English philanthropist, founded the YMCA (d. 1905)
1827 – Afzal-ud-Daulah, Asaf Jah V, 5th Nizam of Hyderabad
1835 – Theodore Thomas, American conductor, founded the Chicago Symphony Orchestra (d. 1905)
1844 – Henry J. Heinz, American businessman, founded the H. J. Heinz Company (d. 1919)
1865 – Hans E. Kinck, Norwegian philologist and author (d. 1926)
1871 – Johan Oscar Smith, Norwegian evangelist, founded the Brunstad Christian Church (d. 1943)
1872 – Emily Davison, English educator and activist (d. 1913)
  1872   – Harlan F. Stone, American lawyer and jurist, 12th Chief Justice of the United States (d. 1946)
1879 – Ernst Mally, Austrian philosopher and academic (d. 1944)
1881 – Hans Kelsen, Czech-American jurist and philosopher (d. 1973)
1884 – Friedrich Bergius, German-Argentinian chemist and academic, Nobel Prize laureate (d. 1949)
  1884   – Eleanor Roosevelt, American humanitarian and politician, 32nd First Lady of the United States (d. 1962)
  1884   – Sig Ruman, German-American actor (d. 1967)
1885 – François Mauriac, French novelist, poet, and playwright, Nobel Prize laureate (d. 1970)
1890 – A. V. Kulasingham, Sri Lankan journalist, lawyer, and politician (d. 1978)
1894 – Julius Kuperjanov, Estonian educator and lieutenant (d. 1919)
1896 – Roman Jakobson, Russian-American linguist and theorist (d. 1982)
1897 – Nathan Farragut Twining, American general (d. 1982)
1899 – Eddie Dyer, American baseball player and manager (d. 1964)

1901–present
1901 – Masanobu Tsuji, Japanese colonel and politician (d. 1961)
1902 – Jayaprakash Narayan, Indian activist and politician (d. 1979)
1905 – Fred Trump, American real estate entrepreneur (d. 1999)
1909 – Sir Ken Anderson, Australian politician (d. 1985)
1910 – Cahit Arf, Turkish mathematician and academic (d. 1997)
1911 – Nello Pagani, Italian motorcycle racer and race car driver (d. 2003)
1913 – Joe Simon, American author and illustrator (d. 2011)
1915 – T. Llew Jones, Welsh author and poet (d. 2009)
1916 – Nanaji Deshmukh, Indian educator and activist (d. 2010)
  1916   – Ahmad Abd al-Ghafur Attar, Saudi Arabian writer and journalist (d. 1991) 
1918 – Fred Bodsworth, Canadian journalist and author (d. 2012)
  1918   – Jerome Robbins, American director, producer, and choreographer (d. 1998)
1919 – Art Blakey, American drummer and bandleader (d. 1990)
  1919   – Douglas Albert Munro, United States Coast Guard signalman, posthumously awarded Medal of Honor (d. 1942)
1922 – G. C. Edmondson, American soldier and author (d. 1995)
1924 – André Emmerich, German-American art dealer (d. 2007)
  1924   – Sammy McCrory, Northern Irish footballer (d. 2011)
  1924   – Mal Whitfield, American athlete (d. 2015)
1925 – Elmore Leonard, American novelist, short story writer, and screenwriter (d. 2013)
1926 – Jean Alexander, English actress (d. 2016)
  1926   – Yvon Dupuis, Canadian politician (d. 2017)
  1926   – Thích Nhất Hạnh, Vietnamese monk, author, and poet (d. 2022)
  1926   – Earle Hyman, American actor (d. 2017)
  1926   – Neville Wran, Australian lawyer and politician, 35th Premier of New South Wales (d. 2014)
1927 – Princess Joséphine Charlotte of Belgium (d. 2005)
  1927   – Jim Prior, Baron Prior, English soldier and politician, Secretary of State for Northern Ireland (d. 2016)
1928 – Alfonso de Portago, Spanish race car driver and bobsledder (d. 1957)
  1928   – Roscoe Robinson, Jr., American general (d. 1993)
  1928   – Geoffrey Tordoff, Baron Tordoff, English businessman and politician (d. 2019)
1929 – Curtis Amy, American saxophonist and clarinetist (d. 2002)
1930 – Michael Edwardes, South African-English businessman (d. 2019)
  1930   – LaVell Edwards, American football player and coach (d. 2016)
  1930   – Sam Johnson, American colonel and politician (d. 2020)
1932 – Saul Friedländer, Israeli historian and author
  1932   – Barry Jones, Australian lawyer and politician
  1932   – Dottie West, American singer-songwriter and actress (d. 1991)
1935 – Dan Evins, American businessman, founded Cracker Barrel Old Country Store (d. 2012)
  1935   – Daniel Quinn, American author and environmentalist (d. 2018)
1936 – C. Gordon Fullerton, American colonel, engineer, and astronaut (d. 2013)
  1936   – Billy Higgins, American drummer and educator (d. 2001)
  1936   – James M. McPherson, American historian and author
1937 – Bobby Charlton, English footballer and manager
  1937   – R. H. W. Dillard, American poet, author, and critic
  1937   – Ron Leibman, American actor and screenwriter (d. 2019)
1938 – Michael Stear, English air marshal (d. 2020)
1939 – Maria Bueno, Brazilian tennis player (d. 2018)
  1939   – Austin Currie, Northern Irish lawyer and SDLP politician
1940 – Lucy Morgan, American newspaper reporter
1941 – Lester Bowie, American trumpet player and composer (d. 1999)
1942 – Richard Wilson, Baron Wilson of Dinton, Welsh academic and politician
  1942   – Amitabh Bachchan, Indian film actor, producer, television host, and former politician
1943 – Keith Boyce, Barbadian cricketer (d. 1996)
  1943   – Michael Harloe, English sociologist and academic
  1943   – John Nettles, English actor and writer
  1943   – Ilmar Reepalu, Swedish lawyer and politician
  1943   – Gene Watson, American singer-songwriter and producer
1944 – Rodney Marsh, English footballer, manager, and sportscaster
1945 – Andrew Logan, English sculptor and painter
1946 – Elinor Goodman, English journalist
  1946   – Daryl Hall, American singer-songwriter, guitarist, and producer
  1946   – Sawao Katō, Japanese gymnast
1947 – Thomas Boswell, American journalist and author
  1947   – Lucas Papademos, Greek economist and politician, 183rd Prime Minister of Greece
  1947   – Alan Pascoe, English hurdler
1948 – David Rendall, English tenor and actor
  1948   – Peter Turkson, Ghanaian cardinal
1949 – Henry Luke Orombi, Ugandan archbishop
  1949   – Lawrence Tanter, American basketball player and sportscaster
1950 – William R. Forstchen, American historian and author
  1950   – Amos Gitai, Israeli director, producer, and author
  1950   – Patty Murray, American educator and politician
1951 – Bruce Bartlett, American economist, historian, and author
  1951   – Jean-Jacques Goldman, French singer-songwriter and guitarist
  1951   – Jon Miller, American sportscaster
  1951   – Louise Rennison, English author and comedian (d. 2016)
  1951   – Charles Shyer, American director, producer, and screenwriter
1952 – Paulette Carlson, American singer-songwriter and guitarist
1953 – David Morse, American actor, director, producer, and screenwriter
1954 – David Michaels, American epidemiologist and politician
  1954   – Vojislav Šešelj, Serbian lawyer and politician, Deputy Prime Minister of Serbia
1955 – Norm Nixon, American basketball player and sportscaster
1956 – Nicanor Duarte, Paraguayan lawyer and politician, President of Paraguay
  1956   – Derek Ringer, Scottish race car driver
1957 – Francky Dury, Belgian footballer and manager
  1957   – Dawn French, Welsh-English actress, comedian and screenwriter
1959 – Wayne Gardner, Australian motorcycle racer
  1959   – Allan Little, Scottish journalist and author
1960 – Randy Breuer, American basketball player
  1960   – Nicola Bryant, English actress
  1960   – Curt Ford, American baseball player and manager
  1960   – Gábor Pölöskei, Hungarian footballer and manager
1961 – Neil Buchanan, English guitarist
  1961   – Steve Young, American football player and sportscaster
1962 – Joan Cusack, American actress
  1962   – Andy McCoy, Finnish musician
1963 – Marcus Graham, Australian actor
  1963   – Brian Rice, Scottish footballer and manager
  1963   – Ronny Rosenthal, Israeli footballer 
  1963   – Rima Te Wiata, English-New Zealand actress and singer
1964 – Michael J. Nelson, American actor, director, and screenwriter
1965 – Sean Patrick Flanery, American actor and producer
  1965   – Alexander Hacke, German singer-songwriter, guitarist, and producer
  1965   – Orlando Hernández, Cuban baseball player
  1965   – Volodymyr Horilyi, Ukrainian footballer and coach
1966 – Luke Perry, American actor and producer (d. 2019)
  1966   – Todd Snider, American singer-songwriter
  1966   – Stephen Williams, Welsh lawyer and politician
1967 – Jay Grdina, American businessman and pornographic actor
  1967   – Artie Lange, American actor and comedian
  1967   – David Starr, American race car driver
1968 – Jane Krakowski, American actress and singer
  1968   – Claude Lapointe, Canadian ice hockey player and coach
  1968   – Brett Salisbury, American football player and author
1969 – Merieme Chadid, Moroccan astronomer and explorer
  1969   – Stephen Moyer, English actor
  1969   – Prince Constantijn of the Netherlands
1970 – Chidi Ahanotu, American football player
  1970   – Vanessa Harding, American wrestler
  1970   – MC Lyte, American rapper, DJ, and actress
  1970   – Andy Marriott, English-Welsh footballer and manager
  1970   – Shin Tae-yong, South Korean footballer and coach
1971 – Petra Haden, American violinist and singer
  1971   – Justin Lin, American film director
  1971   – Oleksandr Pomazun, Ukrainian footballer and manager
1972 – Marcus Bai, Papua New Guinean rugby league player
1973 – Brendan B. Brown, American singer-songwriter and guitarist
  1973   – Greg Chalmers, Australian golfer
  1973   – Steven Pressley, Scottish footballer and manager
  1973   – Niki Xanthou, Greek long jumper
  1973   – Dmitri Young, American baseball player and radio host
1974 – Jason Arnott, Canadian ice hockey player
  1974   – Rachel Barton Pine, American violinist and educator
1976 – Dominic Aitchison, Scottish bass player and songwriter
  1976   – Emily Deschanel, American actress and producer
1977 – Matt Bomer, American actor and producer
  1977   – Igor Figueiredo, Brazilian snooker player
  1977   – Jérémie Janot, French footballer and manager
  1977   – Desmond Mason, American basketball player and sportscaster
  1977   – Rhett McLaughlin, American YouTuber
  1977   – Ty Wigginton, American baseball player
1978 – Carl Bussey, American soccer player
  1978   – Takuya Kawaguchi, Japanese footballer
1979 – Jamar Beasley, American football player
  1979   – Andy Douglas, American wrestler
  1979   – Kim Yong-dae, South Korean footballer
1980 – Nyron Nosworthy, English-born Jamaican footballer
1982 – Cameron Knowles, New Zealand footballer
  1982   – Jeff Larish, American baseball player
  1982   – Terrell Suggs, American football player
  1982   – Mauricio Victorino, Uruguayan footballer
1984 – Sergio Hellings, Dutch footballer
  1984   – Martha MacIsaac, Canadian-American actress, producer, and screenwriter
  1984   – Zeb Taia, Australian-New Zealand rugby league player
  1984   – Jane Zhang, Chinese singer-songwriter
1985 – Nesta Carter, Jamaican sprinter
  1985   – Yang Cheng, Chinese footballer
  1985   – Álvaro Fernández, Uruguayan footballer
  1985   – Michelle Trachtenberg, American actress
1986 – Ikioi Shōta, Japanese sumo wrestler
1987 – Tony Beltran, American soccer player
  1987   – Mike Conley, Jr., American basketball player
  1987   – Nathan Coulter-Nile, Australian cricketer
1988 – Omar Gonzalez, American soccer player
  1988   – Ricochet, American wrestler
1989 – Michelle Wie, American golfer
1990 – Joo, South Korean singer and actress
  1990   – Sebastian Rode, German footballer
1991 – Kika van Es, Dutch footballer
  1991   – Toby Fox, American video game developer and composer
1992 – Riffi Mandanda, Congolese footballer
  1992   – Ligi Sao, New Zealand rugby league player
  1992   – Christian Davis, English cricketer
  1992   – Cardi B, American rapper
1993 – Hardik Pandya, Indian cricketer
1994 – Clésio Baúque, Mozambican footballer
  1994   – T. J. Watt, American football player
1995 – Nicolás Jarry, Chilean tennis player
2001 – Maja Chwalińska, Polish tennis player
  2001   – Daniel Maldini, Italian footballer
  2001   – Jacob Preston, Australian rugby league player

Deaths

Pre-1600
 965 – Bruno the Great, Archbishop of Cologne (b. 925)
1086 – Sima Guang, Chinese historian and statesman (b. 1019)
1159 – William of Blois, Count of Boulogne and Earl of Surrey (b. c. 1137)
1188 – Robert I, Count of Dreux (b. 1123)
1303 – Pope Boniface VIII (b. 1235)
1347 – Louis IV, Holy Roman Emperor (b. 1282)
1424 – Jan Žižka, Czech general and Hussite leader
1531 – Huldrych Zwingli, Swiss pastor and theologian (b. 1484)
1542 – Thomas Wyatt, English poet and diplomat (born 1503)
1579 – Sokollu Mehmed Pasha, Ottoman politician, 43rd Grand Vizier of the Ottoman Empire (b. 1506)

1601–1900
1667 – Mattias de' Medici, Italian noble (b. 1613)
1684 – James Tuchet, 3rd Earl of Castlehaven (b. c. 1617)
1698 – William Molyneux, Irish philosopher and writer (b. 1656)
1705 – Guillaume Amontons, French physicist and instrument maker (b. 1663)
1708 – Ehrenfried Walther von Tschirnhaus, German mathematician, physicist, physician, and philosopher (b. 1651)
1721 – Edward Colston, English merchant and politician (b. 1636)
1725 – Hans Herr, Swiss-American bishop (b. 1639)
1779 – Casimir Pulaski, Polish-American general (b. 1745)
1809 – Meriwether Lewis, American captain, explorer, and politician, 2nd Governor of Louisiana Territory (b. 1774)
1821 – John Ross Key, American lieutenant, lawyer, and judge (b. 1754)
1837 – Samuel Wesley, English organist and composer (b. 1766)
1852 – Gotthold Eisenstein, German mathematician and academic (b. 1823)
1889 – James Prescott Joule, English physicist and brewer (b. 1818)
1896 – Edward Benson, English archbishop (b. 1829)
  1896   – Anton Bruckner, Austrian organist, composer, and educator (b. 1824)
1897 – Léon Boëllmann, French organist and composer (b. 1862)

1901–present
1904 – Mary Tenney Gray, American editorial writer, club-woman, philanthropist, and suffragette (b. 1833)
1908 – Rita Cetina Gutiérrez, Mexican poet, educator, and activist (b. 1846)
1932 – William Alden Smith, American lawyer and politician (b. 1859)
1935 – Steele Rudd, Australian author (b. 1868)
1940 – Vito Volterra, Italian mathematician and physicist (b. 1860)
1941 – Heinrich Gutkin, Estonian businessman and politician (b. 1879)
  1941   – Mihkel Pung, Estonian politician, 11th Estonian Minister of Foreign Affairs (b. 1876)
1958 – Maurice de Vlaminck, French painter (b. 1876)
1960 – Richard Cromwell, American actor (b. 1910)
1961 – Chico Marx, American comedian (b. 1887)
1963 – Jean Cocteau, French author, poet, and playwright (b. 1889)
1965 – Dorothea Lange, American photographer and journalist (b. 1895)
  1965   – Walther Stampfli, Swiss lawyer and politician, 50th President of the Swiss Confederation (b. 1884)
1967 – Stanley Morison, typographer, known for work on Times New Roman font (b. 1889)
1968 – Selim Sarper, Turkish educator and politician, 13th Turkish Minister of Foreign Affairs (b. 1899)
1971 – Tamanoumi Masahiro, Japanese sumo wrestler, the 51st Yokozuna (b. 1944)
  1971   – Chesty Puller, American general (b. 1898)
1976 – Alfredo Bracchi, Italian author, screenwriter, and songwriter (b. 1897)
1977 – MacKinlay Kantor, American journalist, author, and screenwriter (b. 1904)
1983 – R. Fraser Armstrong, Canadian administrator and engineer (b. 1889)
1984 – Benno Schotz, Scottish sculptor and engineer (b. 1891)
1986 – Norm Cash, American baseball player and sportscaster (b. 1934)
1988 – Bonita Granville, American actress (b. 1923)
1989 – M. King Hubbert, American geologist and academic (b. 1904)
1991 – Redd Foxx, American actor and comedian (b. 1922)
1993 – Andy Stewart, Scottish singer and entertainer (b. 1933)
1996 – Keith Boyce, Barbadian cricketer (b. 1943)
  1996   – Eleanor Cameron, Canadian-American author and critic (b. 1912)
  1996   – Renato Russo, Brazilian singer-songwriter and guitarist (b. 1960)
  1996   – Joe Morris, English-Canadian lieutenant and trade union leader (b. 1913)
1998 – Richard Denning, American actor (b. 1914)
1999 – Leo Lionni, Dutch-American author and illustrator (b. 1910)
2000 – Luc-Marie Bayle, French historian, photographer, and painter (b. 1914)
  2000   – Donald Dewar, Scottish politician, 1st First Minister of Scotland (b. 1937)
2001 – Beni Montresor, Italian director, set designer, and illustrator (b. 1926)
2004 – Keith Miller, Australian cricketer and pilot (b. 1919)
2005 – Shan-ul-Haq Haqqee, Pakistani-Canadian linguist, journalist, and poet (b. 1917)
  2005   – Attilâ İlhan, Turkish poet, author, and journalist (b. 1925)
  2005   – Edward Szczepanik, Polish economist and politician, Prime Minister of Poland (b. 1915)
2006 – Cory Lidle, American baseball player (b. 1972)
2007 – David Lee "Tex" Hill, South Korean-American general and pilot (b. 1915)
  2007   – Werner von Trapp, Austrian-American singer (b. 1915)
2008 – Marjorie Fletcher, English Director of the Women's Royal Naval Service (b. 1932)
  2008   – Jörg Haider, Austrian lawyer and politician, Governor of Carinthia (b. 1950)
  2008   – Ernst-Paul Hasselbach, Surinamese-Dutch television host and producer (b. 1966)
  2008   – Neal Hefti, American trumpet player and composer (b. 1922)
2009 – Angelo DiGeorge, American physician and endocrinologist (b. 1922)
  2009   – Halit Refiğ, Turkish director, producer, and screenwriter (b. 1934)
2012 – Avrohom Genachowsky, Israeli rabbi (b. 1936)
  2012   – Helmut Haller, German footballer and coach (b. 1939)
  2012   – Edward Kossoy, Polish lawyer, publicist, and activist (b. 1913)
  2012   – Édgar Negret, Colombian sculptor (b. 1920)
  2012   – Champ Summers, American baseball player and coach (b. 1946)
2013 – María de Villota, Spanish racing driver (b. 1980)
  2013   – Erich Priebke, German captain (b. 1913)
2014 – Anita Cerquetti, Italian soprano (b. 1931)
  2014   – Carmelo Simeone, Argentinian footballer (b. 1933)
  2014   – Bob Such, Australian educator and politician (b. 1944)
2015 – Dean Chance, American baseball player and manager (b. 1941)
2017 – Clifford Husbands, Barbadian politician (b. 1926)
2019 – Alexei Leonov, Soviet/Russian cosmonaut and first human to conduct a spacewalk (b. 1934)
2022 – Angela Lansbury, English-American actress, singer, and producer (b. 1925)

Holidays and observances
 Christian feast days:
 Agilbert
 Alexander Sauli
 Andronicus, Probus, and Tarachus (Roman Catholic Church)
 Æthelburh of Barking
 Bruno the Great
 Cainnech of Aghaboe
 Gratus of Oloron
 Gummarus
 James the Deacon (Church of England, Roman Catholic Church, Eastern Orthodox Church)
 Lommán of Trim
 Maria Soledad Torres y Acosta
 Nectarius of Constantinople
 Nicasius, Quirinus, Scubiculus, and Pientia
 Philip the Evangelist
 Pope John XXIII (Roman Catholic Church)
 Zenaida and Philonella
 October 11 (Eastern Orthodox liturgics)
 General Pulaski Memorial Day (United States)
 International Day of the Girl Child
 International Newspaper Carrier Day
 National Coming Out Day
 Revolution Day (North Macedonia)

References

External links

 
 
 

Days of the year
October